The United States Institute for Theatre Technology (USITT) is a membership organization which aims to advance the skills and knowledge of theatre, entertainment and performing arts professionals involved in the areas of design, production and technology, and to generally promote their interests.  To this end, the USITT mounts conferences and exhibitions, promulgates awards and publications (including the official journal Theatre Design & Technology), and supports research.  USITT is a non-profit organization which has its headquarters in Syracuse, New York.

USITT heads up a conference held annually since 1961.  The conference focuses on various workshops, that help educate attendees on several aspects of theatre.  They also have a stage expo, in which companies showcase their products to the individuals attending the conference.  There are also many opportunities for students to show their portfolios for review, and to get a look at programs offered by universities and colleges around the country.

The members of the Institute have created a number of projects that have had a lasting impact upon the industry, such as the famed Dingleberries in Color exhibit staged in 2004.

USITT sponsors the annual Young Designers and Technicians Awards recognizing the finest young people in the industry.

Commissions

Sound Design Commission
The Sound Design Commission is a society which assists and promotes theatrical technical professions in the United States. It is one of the newest Commissions created by the USITT within their working groups.  In 1980 it appeared as the "Lighting and Sound Design Commission" and the two groups met and worked together for several years until the Sound Design members dramatically outnumbered the Lighting Design members and the Commission was split into two.  The first Sound Design Commissioner was Charlie Richmond who served from 1980 through 1988.  It remains one of the most active Commissions within the USITT.

Education Commission
The Education Commission serves students and educators in all areas of theatre design and technology. A diverse group of educators and a student liaison work to develop exciting and innovative programming for each Annual Conference & Stage Expo. The Commission regularly covers such topics as teaching, mentoring, tenure and promotion, curriculum, and student life. In addition, the work of the Education Commission continues throughout the year in the forms of several ongoing projects and archives.

Other Commissions
USITT also has an Engineering Commission, a Lighting Commission, a Management Commission, a Scene Design Commission, a Costume Commission among others.

Conference sites
2026 Long Beach, California

2025 Columbus, Ohio

2024 Seattle, Washington 

2023 St. Louis, Missouri

2022 Baltimore, Maryland

2021 Virtual

2020 Cancelled

2019 Louisville, Kentucky

2018 Fort Lauderdale, Florida

2017
St. Louis, Missouri

2016
Salt Lake City, Utah

2015
Cincinnati, Ohio
Duke Energy Convention Center

2014
Fort Worth, Texas

2013 
Milwaukee, Wisconsin
Frontier Airlines Center

2012
Long Beach, California
Long Beach Convention and Entertainment Center

2011 
Charlotte, North Carolina

2010
Kansas City, Missouri
Kansas City Convention Center

2009
Cincinnati, Ohio
Duke Energy Center

2008
Houston, Texas
George R. Brown Convention Center
 
2007
Phoenix, Arizona
Phoenix Convention Center

2006 
Louisville, Kentucky
Kentucky International Convention Center

2005 
Toronto, Ontario, Canada
Metro Toronto Convention Centre
 
2004
Long Beach, California
Long Beach Convention and Entertainment Center
  
2003
Minneapolis, Minnesota
Minneapolis Convention Center

2002 
New Orleans, Louisiana
Louisiana Superdome

2001
Long Beach, California
Long Beach Convention and Entertainment Center 
 
2000 
Denver, Colorado
Denver Convention Complex
 
1999  
Toronto, Ontario, Canada
Metro Toronto Convention Centre
 
1998 
Long Beach, California
Long Beach Convention Center
  
1997 
Pittsburgh, Pennsylvania 
David L. Lawrence Convention Center / Doubletree Hotel
  
1996 
Fort Worth, Texas
Tarrant County Convention Center / Radisson Hotel
  
1995 
Las Vegas, Nevada
MGM Grand Hotel & Theme Park
 
1994 
Nashville, Tennessee
Nashville Convention Center & Stouffers' Hotel
  
1993 
Wichita, Kansas
Century II Convention Center / various hotels
  
1992 
Seattle, Washington 
Washington State Convention & Trade Center / Seattle Sheraton
  
1991 
Boston, Massachusetts
Sheraton/Hynes Veterans Memorial Convention Center
 
1990 
Milwaukee, Wisconsin
Hyatt Regency Hotel / MECCA
 
1989 
Calgary, Alberta, Canada
Calgary Convention Centre
  
1988 
Anaheim, California 
Disneyland Hotel
  
1987 
Minneapolis, Minnesota
Hyatt Regency Hotel
  
1986 
Oakland, California
Hyatt Regency Hotel
  
1985 
New York, New York
Sheraton Center Hotel
Dedicated to Harold Burris-Meyer and Hans Sondheimer
 
1984 
Orlando, Florida
Hyatt Regency Hotel
 
1983 
Corpus Christi, Texas
Bayfront Convention Center
Dedicated to Walter H. Walters
  
1982 
Denver, Colorado 
Hilton Hotel
Dedicated to Herbert D. Greggs
  
1981 
Cleveland, Ohio
Stouffers' Inn
Dedicated to Margaret Ezekiel
  
1980 
Kansas City, Kansas
Glenwood Manor Convention Center
 
1979 
Seattle, Washington 
Olympic Hotel
  
1978 
Phoenix, Arizona 
The Adams Hotel
  
1977 
Washington, DC
Loews L'Enfant Hotel

1976
New Orleans, Louisiana
Marriott Hotel
  
1975 
Anaheim, California
Anaheim Convention Center
  
1974 
New York, New York 
Waldorf Astoria Hotel
 
1973 
St. Louis, Missouri 
Bel Air East Hotel
  
1972 
San Francisco, California
Mark Hopkins Hotel
  
1971 
Dallas, Texas
Marriott Hotel
 
1970 
New York, New York 
Barbizon Plaza Hotel
 
1969
Los Angeles, California 
Hollywood Roosevelt Hotel
 
1968 
Chicago, Illinois
Goodman Theatre
 
1967 
New York, New York 
Barbizon Plaza Hotel

1966
Toronto, Ontario, Canada
University of Toronto
 
1965 
Bloomington, Indiana
Indiana University
  
1964 
New York, New York
Barbizon Plaza Hotel
  
1963
New York, New York 
The Juilliard School
  
1962 
New York, New York
Time-Life Building
 
1961 
New York, New York 
The Juilliard School

References

External links
 USITT website

Theatrical organizations in the United States